Halmstad University is a university college (Swedish: högskola) in Halmstad, Sweden. It was established in 1983. Halmstad University is a public higher education institution offering bachelor's and master's programmes in various fields of studies. In addition, it conducts Ph.D. programmes in three fields of research, namely, Information Technology, Innovation Science and Health and Lifestyle.

Statistics 
Halmstad University has 12,039 students, 59 professors and 88 research students. The study programmes and courses cover 50 programmes and 200 single subject courses (all of the numbers are from 2021).

Profile  
Halmstad University is often called The Innovation Driven University. It conducts education and research within a broad field, but three profile areas are prominent: Innovation Sciences, Information Technology and Health and Lifestyle. These areas make a base for the University's activities and it is also in these that the University offers education on a postgraduate level.

Schools 
Halmstad University is organised into the following 4 schools (called "academies" in Swedish):
School of Business, Innovation and Sustainability
School of Health and Welfare
School of Education, Humanities and Social Sciences 
School of Information Technology

References

University colleges in Sweden
Halmstad
Florence Network
Educational institutions established in 1983
1983 establishments in Sweden